The 2003–04 LEN Trophy was the 12th edition of LEN's second-tier competition for men's water polo clubs.

Knockout stage

Eight Finals

|}

Quarter-finals

Semi-finals

Final

See also
2003–04 LEN Euroleague

References
 LEN-kupa 2003-2004 nemzetisport.hu

2003 in water polo
2004 in water polo